Iphiclides feisthamelii, the southern scarce swallowtail, southern swallowtail or Iberian scarce swallowtail, is a butterfly found in Italy, Slovenia, southern France, Spain, Portugal, Morocco, Algeria and Tunisia. It is sometimes considered a subspecies of I. podalirius.

Description 

The larva feeds on Prunus amygdalus (almond), P. persica (peach), P. insititia (a kind of plum), P. longipes, Pyrus communis (common pear), Malus domesticus (apple) and Crataegus oxyacantha.

References

External links
Moths and Butterflies of Europe and North Africa
Iphiclides feisthamelii on Guy Padfield's Butterfly Page

Iphiclides
Butterflies described in 1832